The Francis Armstrong House (also known as Tower Apartments) is a historic house in Salt Lake City, Utah. It is locally significant as a fine example of Queen Anne style architecture.

Description and history 
The -story, Queen Anne style house was built in 1892, and was designed by William Ward and constructed by Taylor, Romney & Armstrong as the home of Salt Lake City mayor Francis Armstrong. The scheme of the house is thought to have been brought over by Armstrong from England in 1891, and is apparently based on an English home of the period. It was listed on the National Register of Historic Places on May 23, 1980.

References

Houses completed in 1892
Houses in Salt Lake City
Houses on the National Register of Historic Places in Utah
Queen Anne architecture in Utah
1892 establishments in Utah Territory
National Register of Historic Places in Salt Lake City